The Friend of the Jaguar (Italian: L'amico del giaguaro) is a 1959 Italian comedy film directed by Giuseppe Bennati and starring Walter Chiari, Isabelle Corey and Carlo Romano. The film's sets were designed by the art director Piero Filippone.

Cast
 Walter Chiari as Augusto
 Isabelle Corey as Marisa
 Carlo Romano as Il commendatore
 Mario Carotenuto as Cesare
 Carlo Delle Piane as Pecorino
 Alberto Talegalli as Il rurale
 Toni Ucci as Gettone 
 Giuseppe Robby as Vittorio
 Anna Campori as Gianna
 Francesco Mulè as Ugo, l'orefice 	
 Elke Sommer as Grete
 Riccardo Garrone as Il rappresentante

References

External links
 

1959 films
1959 comedy films
1950s Italian-language films
Italian comedy films
Films directed by Giuseppe Bennati
1950s Italian films